, also known as NEG, is a Japanese glass manufacturer. The company is a manufacturer of glass for flat panel displays (FPD). It has about 20% share in the world's production of glass for liquid crystal displays (LCD).

The company is listed on the Tokyo Stock Exchange and is a constituent of the Nikkei 225 stock index.

History
1944: Established with investment from NEC Corporation and other companies.
1949: Separated from NEC, and Nippon Electric Glass was founded as an independent company.
1951: Successfully began use of the Danner process to form glass tubing automatically; initiated mass production.
1956: Started continuous production of glass tubing using a tank furnace.
1965: Started production of black-and-white CRT glass.
1968: Started production of color CRT glass.
1973: Company stock listed on the Tokyo Stock Exchange (TSE) and Osaka Securities Exchange (OSE) (Second Section).
1974: Started production of thin sheet glass for LCDs.
1983: Company stock transferred to the First Section of the TSE and OSE.
1988: Started CRT glass operations in the US via joint venture with O-I Glass. (Techneglas)
1998: Started production of PDP substrate glass using the float process.
1999: Acquired ISO 14001 certification for all plants in Japan. 
1999: Started production of LCD substrate glass by the overflow process.
2004: Ended CRT glass production in the US and Mexico.
2010: Started production of substrate glass for solar cells.
2017: Acquired three of the largest fiberglass factories in the world from PPG, the largest of which being in Shelby, North Carolina.

Products

Glass for display devices 
Glass for Liquid Crystal Displays (LCDs)
Substrate glass for LCDs
Glass tubing for cold cathode fluorescent lamps (CCFL)
Cell spacing for LCDs (micro rods)
Glass for Plasma Display Panels (PDPs)
Substrate glass for PDPs
Glass pastes for PDPs
Glass for exhaust tubes, tablets, and firing setters
Glass for CRTs
Panel glass for CRTs
CRT neck tubes, stem tubes, and exhaust tubes

Glass for electronic devices
Powder glass
Cover glass for image sensors
Glass for diodes
Glass for laser diodes
Glass for optical devices
Glass ferrules and micro capillaries for optical connectors
Glass material for aspherical lenses
Collimator components
Micro prisms
Coupler housing

Glass fiber
Chopped strands for function plastics
Yarns for printed circuit boards
Roving for reinforced plastic
Alkali resistant glass fiber

Building materials, heat-resistant glass
Glass for building materials
Glass blocks
Glass-ceramic building materials
Fire-rated glass
Radiation shielding glass
Heat-resistant glass
Super heat-resistant glass-ceramic
Super heat-resistant glass-ceramic for cooking appliance top plates
Heat-resistant glass
Glass for lighting and medical use
Glass for lighting
Glass for medical and laboratory applications
Glass for thermos flasks

Glassmaking and processing machinery

References

External links
  

Glassmaking companies of Japan
Companies listed on the Tokyo Stock Exchange
Companies based in Shiga Prefecture
Manufacturing companies established in 1949
Glass trademarks and brands
Japanese brands